Rade Novković (born June 25, 1980) is a Serbian former football defender who played in the Second League of FR Yugoslavia, First League of Serbia and Montenegro, Russian Premier League, Serbian SuperLiga, and the Canadian Soccer League.

Playing career 
Novković began his career with  FK Jedinstvo Ub in the Second League of FR Yugoslavia. In 2004, he moved up to the First League of Serbia and Montenegro to play with FK Rad. In 2007, he went abroad to Russia to sign with FC Luch-Energiya Vladivostok of the Russian Premier League, where he played 51 matches and recorded two goals. He returned to Serbia in 2010 to play in the Serbian SuperLiga with FK Sloboda Point Sevojno.

In 2011, he went overseas to Canada to sign with Brantford Galaxy of the Canadian Soccer League. The following year he was transferred to rivals London City. In 2013, he helped London secure a postseason for the first time since the 2000 CPSL season by finishing seventh in the overall standings. He featured in the quarterfinal match against York Region Shooters, where London won in a penalty shootout. In the next round London faced Kingston FC, but suffered a 4-2 defeat. He concluded his career with London in 2015.

References

External links
 Profile and stats at Srbijafudbal
  Player page on the official Luch-Energiya website
 

1980 births
Living people
Serbian footballers
People from Prijepolje
FK Jedinstvo Ub players
FC Luch Vladivostok players
Serbian expatriate footballers
Expatriate footballers in Russia
Russian Premier League players
FK Rad players
FK Sloboda Užice players
Canadian Soccer League (1998–present) players
Serbian SuperLiga players
London City players
Brantford Galaxy players
Association football defenders